The Symphony No. 11 in G minor, Op. 103 (subtitled The Year 1905), by Dmitri Shostakovich was written in 1957 and premiered by the USSR Symphony Orchestra under Natan Rakhlin on 30 October 1957. The subtitle of the symphony refers to the events of the Russian Revolution of 1905, which the symphony depicts. The first performance given outside the Soviet Union took place in London's Royal Festival Hall on 22 January 1958 when Sir Malcolm Sargent conducted the BBC Symphony Orchestra. The United States premiere was performed by Leopold Stokowski conducting the Houston Symphony on 7 April 1958. The symphony was conceived as a popular piece and proved an instant success in Russia, his greatest one since the Leningrad Symphony fifteen years earlier. The work's popular success, as well as its earning him a Lenin Prize in April 1958, marked the composer's formal rehabilitation from the Zhdanov Doctrine of 1948.

Instrumentation
The symphony is scored for 3 flutes (3rd doubling piccolo), 3 oboes (3rd doubling cor anglais), 3 clarinets (3rd doubling bass clarinet), 3 bassoons (3rd doubling contrabassoon), 4 horns, 3 trumpets, 3 trombones, tuba, timpani, triangle, snare drum, cymbals, orchestral bass drum, tam-tam, xylophone, tubular bells, 2 harps (preferably doubled), celesta and strings.

It has become common professional performance practice for the tubular bells part (only used at the conclusion of the fourth movement) to be played on 4 large church bells, each chromatically tuned to the four notes required (G, C, B flat and B natural).

Structure

The symphony has four movements played without break, and lasts approximately one hour.

The Eleventh is sometimes dubbed "a film score without the film". An additional thread is provided by the nine revolutionary songs that appear during the work. Some of these songs date back to the 19th century, others to the year 1905. Shostakovich integrates them into the textures of his symphony. This use of folk and revolutionary songs was a departure from his usual style. They were also songs the composer knew well. His family knew and sang them regularly while he was growing up. In his study of Shostakovich's symphonies, Hugh Ottaway praised the Eleventh as one of the great achievements in program music.

Overview

Composition
Shostakovich originally intended the Eleventh Symphony to mark the 50th anniversary of the Russian Revolution of 1905 and would have written it in 1955. Several personal factors kept him from composing the work until 1957. These factors included his mother's death, his tumultuous second marriage and the arrival of many newly freed friends from the Gulag. Events in Hungary in 1956 may have stirred Shostakovich out of his compositional inertia and acted as a catalyst for his writing the symphony.

Requiem for a generation
According to the composer's son-in-law Yevgeny Chukovsky, the original title sheet for this symphony read not "1905" but "1906", the year of the composer's birth. This causes critics to view the Eleventh Symphony as a requiem not only for the composer himself but for his generation. Still, because the work was composed for the Revolution, its purpose is not lost. The 1905 Revolution was not politicized by the Party, so the piece maintained its romantic aura in the eyes of later generations. Because of this romantic aura, The Eleventh Symphony is among a group of diverse works that embody a spirit of struggle for a just cause, such as Sergei Eisenstein's film Battleship Potemkin and Boris Pasternak's narrative poems "1905" and "Lieutenant Schmidt."

The title, "The Year 1905", recalls the start of the first Russian Revolution of 1905, which was partially fired by the events on 9 January (9 January by the Julian calendar still in use in Russia at the time, modern date of 22 January 1905) of that year. Some Western critics characterized the symphony as overblown "film music" – in other words, as an agitprop broadsheet lacking both substance and depth.

Most Mussorgskian symphony
Shostakovich considered this work his most "Mussorgskian" symphony. He wrote the Eleventh in a simple, direct manner. According to Solomon Volkov, Shostakovich allegedly told him that the symphony was "about the people, who have stopped believing because the cup of evil has run over." 

In the first movement, the song "Slushay!" ("Listen!") contains the text "The autumn night is ... black as the tyrant's conscience," while the final movement refers to a piece including the words "shame on you tyrants." Volkov compares this movement's juxtaposition of revolutionary songs (notably the Varshavianska song) to a cinematic montage, while quoting Anna Akhmatova's description of it as "white birds against a black sky".

Testimony and the Hungarian Revolution 

In the wake of the publishing of Testimony, the Eleventh has attracted speculation over its possible references to the Hungarian Revolution of 1956. According to Solomon Volkov, Shostakovich said that the Eleventh Symphony "deals with contemporary themes even though it's called '1905.'" According to Zoya Tomashevskaya, Shostakovich also allegedly remarked to Igor Belsky not to forget that he "wrote the symphony in the aftermath of (the) Hungarian Uprising". Shostakovich's widow Irina has also said that he had the Hungarian Revolution "in mind" during composition. Extant evidence and the chronology of the symphony's composition suggests that this could not have been the case. When Sofia Khentova asked Shostakovich in 1974 whether the Eleventh was a veiled reference to the Hungarian Revolution, he replied: "No, it is 1905, it is Russian history."

See also
Bloody Sunday
Russian Revolution of 1905

References

Sources
 MacDonald, Ian, The New Shostakovich (Boston: Northeastern University Press, 1990). .
 Schwarz, Boris, ed. Stanley Sadie, "Shostakovich, Dmitry (Dmitryevich)", The New Grove Dictionary of Music and Musicians (London: Macmillan, 1980), 20 vols. .
 Volkov, Solomon, tr. Antonina W. Bouis, Shostakovich and Stalin: The Extraordinary Relationship Between the Great Composer and the Brutal Dictator (New York: Alfred A. Knopf, 2004.) .

External links
 London Shostakovich Orchestra
 SovMusic.ru Some revolutionary songs quoted in the symphony can be heard here. ("Слушай", "Вы жертвою пали...", "Беснуйтесь, тираны", "Варшавянка")

Symphonies by Dmitri Shostakovich
Compositions in G minor
1957 compositions